Fulham Correctional Centre is a medium security Australian prison located in Hopkins Road, Sale, Victoria, Australia. The prison consists of mainstream medium and minimum (fenced and unfenced) security cell blocks, management (solitary), and a protection unit. It was built by Thiess Contractors and completed in 1997.

See also
HM Prison Sale
NALU at Fulham Correctional Centre

References

1997 establishments in Australia
Fulham
Sale, Victoria
Private prisons in Australia
GEO Group
Government buildings completed in 1997